Loricaria spinulifera is a species of catfish in the family Loricariidae. It is native to South America, where it occurs in the Rio Negro basin in Brazil, including the Branco River and the Jauaperi River. It is typically seen in deep channels of blackwater rivers, where it is usually found at depths of 1.5 to 28 m (5 to 92 ft) and distances of 10 to 750 m (33 to 2461 ft) from the shoreline. The environments in which the species occurs are characterized by substrates composed of sand, mud, and organic debris. Individuals of the species collected from deeper water tend to have smaller eyes and less prominent patterning than those collected from shallower areas. An analysis of the stomach contents of a single individual found evidence of feeding on aquatic insect larvae, as well as sand and detritus. The species reaches 13.8 cm (5.4 inches) in standard length and is believed to be a facultative air-breather. Its specific epithet, spinulifera, is derived from Latin and means "spine-bearing", referring to the conspicuous thorn-like odontodes found on its head.

References 

Loricariidae
Fish described in 2008
Catfish of South America
Fish of Brazil